Andreas Barckow is the chairman of the International Accounting Standards Board (IASB).  He became chairman of the IASB on 1 July 2021.  He was previously the President of the Accounting Standards Committee of Germany.  He previously worked for Deloitte.  Upon becoming IASB chairman he stated that his top priorities are accounting for intangible assets and addressing sustainability and ESG issues.

References

German accountants
International Accounting Standards Board members
Paderborn University alumni
Living people
Year of birth missing (living people)